Ban, or BAN, may refer to:

Law 
 Ban (law), a decree that prohibits something, sometimes a form of censorship, being denied from entering or using the place/item
 Imperial ban (Reichsacht), a form of outlawry in the medieval Holy Roman Empire
 Ban (medieval), the sovereign's power to command
 King's ban (Königsbann), a royal command or prohibition in the medieval Holy Roman Empire
 Herem (disambiguation), a Hebrew word usually translated as "the ban"
 A ban could be served on people in apartheid-era South Africa

People 
 Ban (surname), a Chinese surname
 Ban (Korean name), a Korean surname and element in given names
 Ban Ki-moon, United Nations Secretary-General
 King Ban, a king from the Matter of Britain
 Ban (title), a noble title used in Central and Southeastern Europe (Romania, Croatia, Bosnia and Hungary)
 Banate of Bosnia
 Ban of Croatia
 Matija Ban, a Croatian poet
 Oana Ban, a Romanian artistic gymnast
 Shigeru Ban, a Japanese architect
Y Ban (real name Phạm Thị Xuân Ban), a Vietnamese writer

Places 
 Ban, Burkina Faso, a town in Burkina Faso
 Bans, Jura, a commune in eastern France
 Ban, Murree, a village and UC of Rawalpindi District, Pakistan
 Ban, an alternate name of Ben, a city in Iran
 Ban, Iran, a village in Markazi Province, Iran
 Ban, a village in Bănișor Commune, Sălaj County, Romania
 Ban (river), a river in Sălaj County, Romania
 Ban, habitation in Thai muban
 Ban, a settlement in Sarawak, Malaysia
 Ban, Kubu, Karangasem, a village in Bali
 Bans, Raebareli, a village in Uttar Pradesh, India

Internet 
 Ban (Internet), the banning of individual users from websites
 Body Area Network, a wireless network of wearable computing devices
 IP address blocking, a block set up by a server or website that blocks requests originating from particular IP addresses or ranges of addresses
 Stealth banning or shadow banning, a practice used in managing online communities

Codes 
 Balinese language (ISO 639-2 and -3 code "ban"), spoken in Indonesia
BAN, the National Rail code for Banbury railway station in the county of Oxfordshire, UK
BAN, the Chapman code for Banffshire, historic county in Scotland
BAN, the IOC code for Bangladesh at the Olympics
BAN, the IATA code for Basongo Airport in the Democratic Republic of the Congo

Other 
 An alternate spelling for "bann" as in banns of marriage
 Paiban, a clapper used in Chinese music, alternately called BAN)
 Ban (unit), a logarithmic unit of information or weight of evidence
 Ban (deodorant), a brand name deodorant & antiperspirant
 Ban (plural: bani), a coin, the 1/100 part of a Romanian leu or Moldovan leu
 "Ban" (song), a 2021 single by Sakurazaka46
 Basel Action Network
 British Approved Name, for a pharmaceutical substance
 Burrows–Abadi–Needham logic, BAN logic, used to analyse authentication protocols
 Muban, or Ban for short, the lowest administrative subdivision of Thailand
 "B.A.N." (Atlanta), an episode of American TV series Atlanta
 "B.A.N.", a song by Saweetie

Fictional characters 
 Akaza BanBan, nicknamed Ban, a character in Tokusou Sentai Dekaranger
 Ban Mido, a main character of the GetBackers series
 Ban: Fox's Sin of Greed, a sin from The Seven Deadly Sins (2014 TV series)

See also 
 
 
 
 Bann (disambiguation)
 Banned (disambiguation)
 Banning (disambiguation)
 Block (disambiguation)